Adrustam is 2002 Indian Telugu-language action film directed by debutant Sekhar Suri starring Tarun, Gajala and Reema Sen. The film was dubbed in Tamil as Ivan Yaaro.

Cast

 Tarun as Tarun
 Gajala as Keerthi Dhanraj
 Reema Sen as Asha
 Shiju as Robin
 Sivaji as Pawan
 Prakash Raj as Police Officer
 Asha Saini as Smita / Pinky
 Brahmanandam as Valmiki
 Venu Madhav as Tarun's friend
 Jeeva as Magadha
 M. S. Narayana as Smita's husband
 Raghu Kunche as one of the grooms during Keerthi's Swayamvaram
 Narsing Yadav as Valmiki's henchman
 Jayachitra as Mrs. Dhanraj, Keerthi's mother
 Raghunatha Reddy as Dhanraj, Keerthi's father
 Subbaraya Sharma as Astrologer

Soundtrack
The Music Was Composed By Dhina and Released by Aditya Music.

References

External links
 http://www.idlebrain.com/movie/archive/mr-adrustam.html
 

2002 films
2000s Telugu-language films
Indian action thriller films
2002 directorial debut films
Films directed by Sekhar Suri
2002 action thriller films
Super Good Films films